Shane Summers (born 9 October 1981) is a South African cricketer. He played in four first-class and fifteen List A matches from 2003 to 2007.

References

External links
 

1981 births
Living people
South African cricketers
Boland cricketers
Free State cricketers